Kate Tiller  is an academic in the History Faculty at Oxford University, Reader emerita in English local history and a founding Fellow at Kellogg College, University of Oxford. 

Her academic fields are British social and local history, with particular research interests in English rural change post-1750, and in religion and community in Britain since 1730. She also writes on the academic practice of local history, with current interests in local histories of the 20th century and of remembrance and community. She continues to teach on graduate and outreach programmes and to supervise Master's and DPhil students in Chartism and Methodism.

Selected publications

Articles
"Charterville and the Chartist Land Company" in Oxoniensia, L (1985), pp 251–66
"Religion in 19th-century Britain" in J. Golby (ed), Communities and Families. Cambridge University Press and the Open University, 1994, revised edition 1997) pp 155–181
"Rural resistance: Custom, community and conflict in South Oxfordshire, 1800-1914" in O. Ashton et al. (eds), The duty of discontent. Essays for Dorothy Thompson (Mansell, 1995) pp 97–121
"Shopkeeping in 17th-century Oxfordshire: William Brock of Dorchester" in Oxoniensia, LXII (1997), pp 269–286
"English Local History: the state of the art" (Wolfson Lecture, Cambridge, 1998)
"Hook Norton, Oxfordshire: An open village" in J Thirsk (ed), The English Rural Landscape. Oxford University Press, 2000.
"Ways of seeing. Hoskins and the Oxfordshire landscape revisited", in P.S. Barnwell and M. Palmer (eds), Post-medieval Landscapes. Landscape History after Hoskins, Vol.3 (Windgather Press, 2007), pp. 185–200.
"Local history at the crossroads", in The Local Historian (Vol. 37 No.4, November 2007).
"The desert begins to blossom: Oxfordshire and Primitive Methodism, 1824-1860", in Oxoniensia (Vol. LXXI, 2007), pp. 83–109.
"Local History and the Twentieth Century: an overview and suggested agenda", in International Journal of Regional and Local Studies, Vol. 6 ( 2011).
'Local History in England' and 'Local History in Ireland' in C. Kammen and A.H. Wilson (eds), Encyclopaedia of Local History (Alta Mira Press, US, 2013 and later editions).
'Anniversaries, war, and local history', in History News, Winter 2015 (American Association of State and Local History).
'Patterns of Dissent: The Social and Religious Geography of Nonconformity in Three Counties', International Journal of Regional and Local History, Vol. 13, No. 1 (2018), pp. 4-31.
'How to read a chapel', The Chapels Society Journal, 3 (2018), pp. 3-23. [The First Christopher Stell Memorial Lecture}.

Books and edited works
Blenheim: Landscape for a palace. Alan Sutton, 1987. (2nd edition 1997) (Edited with J. Bond)
English local history: an introduction. Alan Sutton, 1992. (Revised edition with chapter on 20th century, 2002; 3rd edition to be published 2020).
Dorchester Abbey: Church and people 635-2005. 2005. (Editor and contributor, including "Religion and community: Dorchester 1800-1920", pp 61–83.)
An historical atlas of Oxfordshire. Oxfordshire Record Society, 2010. (Edited with G. Darkes)
Religious census returns for Berkshire, Berkshire Record Society, 14 (2010), lx +133pp.
Remembrance and community: War memorials and local history. British Association for Local History, 2013.
Parsonages. Shire, 2016.

References

External links
Kate Tiller talking on Capturing Histories - Doing Local History.

Academics of the University of Oxford
Living people
Year of birth missing (living people)
Fellows of the Royal Historical Society
English local historians
Historians of Oxfordshire
Deputy Lieutenants of Oxfordshire
Fellows of the Society of Antiquaries of London
British women historians

Officers of the Order of the British Empire